The Aberrant Years is a compilation album by the noise rock band Feedtime, released on March 8, 2012 by Subpop Records. It compiles the first four of the band's LPs, released from 1985 to 1989: Feedtime, Shovel, Cooper-S and Suction.

Track listing

Release history

References

External links 
 
The Aberrant Years on Sub Pop

2012 compilation albums
Sub Pop compilation albums
Feedtime albums